Cross-country skiing at the 2011 South Asian Winter Games will be held at Auli, India.

Men's events

Women's events

References

Cross-country skiing at the South Asian Winter Games
2011 South Asian Winter Games
South Asian Winter Games